Hassan Souari (born 24 December 1984 in Settat) is a Moroccan footballer, who currently plays for Hassania Agadir.

International career
He made his debut for Morocco against  Mali, friendly, 28 May 2006. And scored goal in the second match against Gabon.

Notes

1984 births
Living people
Moroccan footballers
FC Istres players
Association football forwards
Expatriate footballers in France
Morocco international footballers
Expatriate footballers in Azerbaijan
Moroccan expatriate footballers
FC Baku players
Raja CA players
Difaâ Hassani El Jadidi players
Hatta Club players
Moroccan expatriate sportspeople in France
People from Settat
Olympique Club de Khouribga players
RS Berkane players
UAE First Division League players